William Kenneth Richardson (21 August 1911 in Bourne, Lincolnshire – 27 June 1997 in Bourne, Lincolnshire) was a British racing and test / development driver from England who competed in one Formula One World Championship race.

Richardson started as an engineer for British Racing Motors, before becoming the main development driver for the BRM V16 project in the early 1950s. He was entered by the team to drive a BRM 15, equipped with the V16 engine, in the 1951 Italian Grand Prix. He qualified the car 10th, but was not allowed to start the race when it emerged that he did not possess the correct racing licence due to his lack of experience. He did not make another attempt at entering a World Championship Formula One race.

He did, however, continue to race in both sportscars and endurance events.

Complete Formula One World Championship results
(key)

References 

1911 births
1997 deaths
English Formula One drivers
English racing drivers
BRM Formula One drivers
24 Hours of Le Mans drivers
People from Bourne, Lincolnshire
World Sportscar Championship drivers